Alexander Lernet-Holenia (21 October 1897, in Vienna — 3 July 1976) was an Austrian poet, novelist, dramaturgist and writer of screenplays and historical studies who produced a heterogeneous literary opus that included poetry, psychological novels describing the intrusion of otherworldly or unreal experiences into reality, and recreational films.

Youth and service in World War I
Lernet-Holenia was born in 1897, as Alexander Marie Norbert Lernet to Alexander Lernet (an ocean liner officer) who had married his mother Sidonie (née Holenia) shortly before his birth. He attached his mother's maiden name to his family name only when he was formally adopted by Carinthian relatives of his mother (whose aristocratic family had lost most of its wealth after the war) in 1920. In July 1915, Alexander finished high-school in Waidhofen an der Ybbs and took up Law studies at the University of Vienna, but volunteered for the Austro-Hungarian army in September 1915 and fought in World War I from 1916 onward, serving in the eastern battle theatres and ending the war as a lieutenant. During his service time he first took to poetry, and became a protégé of Rainer Maria Rilke in 1917.

Poet/novelist during the interwar period
After the war Lernet-Holenia became a full-time writer and published his first volume of poetry, Pastorale, in 1921 and his first drama, Demetrius, in 1925.

During the Third Reich
Lernet-Holenia participated in the Invasion of Poland as a reactivated and drafted lieutenant of the reserve, an experience on which he based his 1941 novel Die Blaue Stunde (The Blue Hour) which after the war became known under the title Mars im Widder (Mars in Aries). It has been called "the only Austrian resistance novel" because the plot features an ideologically troubled central character, hints at the existence of active political opposition, and because the Nazi government banned and quarantined the first edition of the book. His work was also part of the literature event in the art competition at the 1936 Summer Olympics.

Although Lernet-Holenia made himself a lucrative business as a popular screenplay writer during the Third Reich, he was one of the few accomplished Austrian authors who kept his distance from National Socialism, and refused to endorse the Nazi political system or to participate in its notorious blood and soil literary efforts. However, to stay in business he had to make arrangements with the regime, which included becoming chief dramaturgist at the "Heeres-Filmstelle" (the audiovisual media center of the Wehrmacht in Berlin, charged with producing propaganda films for military cinemas) after the Polish campaign. Robert Dassanowsky has stated that "[Lernet-Holenia's] early actions in the Reich were confused, appearing to vacillate between naiveté and the often clumsy, often shrewd acts of a survivalist ... a unique but not incomprehensible position." Lernet-Holenia became more outspoken as the war progressed. After his removal from his public position in 1944 he escaped service on the Eastern combat theatre through contrived illness and the help of the resistance network.

Post-war period
Being politically untainted, Lernet-Holenia's public recognition rose steeply once again after World War II, and he became an icon of the Austrian culture scenery. The year 1948 alone saw the casting of three films based on his novels, starring prominent actors such as Maria Schell and Attila Hörbiger. Together with Friedrich Torberg (and later with Günther Nenning) he co-edited the intellectual culture magazine Forum beginning in 1957. In 1969 he was elected president of the Austrian section of the PEN Club but resigned in 1972 in protest when the Nobel Prize was awarded to Heinrich Böll, whom Lernet-Holenia regarded as a supporter of the Red Army Faction.

Private life and personality
Alexander Lernet had married Lernet-Holenia's mother (the widow Baroness Sidonie Boyneburgk-Stettfeld) only shortly before his birth. Rumors that attributed biological fatherhood to a Habsburg archduke were perpetuated by biographers throughout his life and afterwards but were never substantiated. 

In 1923 Alexander Lernet-Holenia — originally a Protestant — converted to the Roman Catholic faith. He was married to Eva Vollbach and lived with her in St. Wolfgang im Salzkammergut from 1926 until 1951 when the couple moved to Vienna. From 1952 until his death, he lived in state apartments in the imperial Hofburg Palace. Lernet-Holenia remained an outspoken political conservative and aristocratic elitist throughout his life, an attitude that brought him into increasing conflict with the prevailing left-wing culture of the 1960s, earned him a reputation as the "difficult old man of Austrian literature," and pushed him into increasing isolation during his final years. 

He died of lung cancer in 1976, two years after publishing his last novel Die Beschwörung (The Conjuration) under the pseudonym G. T. Dampierre.

Honors and Posthumous Recognition
 Kleist Prize (1926)
 Goethe Prize of the city of Bremen (1927)
 City of Vienna Prize for Literature (1951)
 Great Cross of Merit of the Federal Republic of Germany (Großes Verdienstkreuz) (1958)
 Grand Austrian State Prize for Literature (1961)
 Gold Medal of the capital Vienna (1967)
 Austrian Decoration for Science and Art (1968)
 A park in Vienna's Hernals district was named after Lernet-Holenia on 24 September 1999
 The International Alexander Lernet-Holenia Society (Internationale Alexander Lernent-Holenia Gesellschaft) founded in Vienna in 1998 promotes the study, translation and publication of the author's works. Italian writer Roberto Calasso, a Franz Kafka scholar whose own writings reference Central European identity themes and tensions, serves at the Society's president.

Bibliography

 Pastorale (1921, poetry)
 Kanzonnair (1923, poetry)
 Ollapotrida (1926, play)
 Szene als Einleitung zu einer Totenfeier für Rainer Maria Rilke (1927, play)
 Gelegenheit macht Liebe (also Quiproquo, as Clemens Neydisser, with Stefan Zweig, 1928, play)
 Die Abenteuer eines jungen Herrn in Polen (1931, novel)
 Jo und der Herr zu Pferde (1933, novel)
 I Was Jack Mortimer (1933, novel)
 The Standard (1934, novel)
 Der Baron Bagge (1936, novella)
 Tohuwabohu (with Hans Adler, 1936, play)
 Die Auferstehung des Maltravers (The Resurrection of Maltravers, 1936, novel)
 Der Mann im Hut (1937, novel)
 Mona Lisa (1937, novella, the story of Monsieur de Bougainville, the cavalier who falls in love with the girl by seeing the painting and attempts to find her)
 Mars in Aries (1941, novel)
 Beide Sizilien (1942, novel)
 Germanien (1946, poetry)
 Twentieth of July (1947, novella)
 On Resonant Shores (1948, screenplay)
 The Count of Saint Germain (1948, novel)
 Drei große Liebesgeschichten (1950, 3 stories including Mona Lisa, translated in German Stories and Tales)
 Count Luna (1955, novel)
 Die vertauschten Briefe (1958, novel)
 Prinz Eugen (1960, biography)
 Das Halsband der Königin (Paul Zsolnay Verlag, Hamburg/Vienna, 1962, historical study on the Affair of the diamond necklace)
 Die weiße Dame (1965, novel)
 Die Thronprätendenten (1965, play)
 Pilatus. Ein Komplex (1967, novel)
 Die Hexen (1969, novel)
 Die Beschwörung (1974, novel, as G. T. Dampierre)

Filmography 
Abenteuer eines jungen Herrn in Polen, directed by Gustav Fröhlich (1934, based on the novel Die Abenteuer eines jungen Herrn in Polen)
My Life for Maria Isabella, directed by Erich Waschneck (1935, based on the novel The Standard)
I Was Jack Mortimer, directed by Carl Froelich (1935, based on the novel I Was Jack Mortimer)
The Other Life, directed by Rudolf Steinboeck (1948, based on the novella Twentieth of July)
Maresi, directed by Hans Thimig (1948, based on the short story Maresi)
Escándalo nocturno, directed by Juan Carlos Thorry (Argentina, 1951, based on the play Tohuwabohu)
*Adventure in Vienna, directed by Emil-Edwin Reinert (1952, based on the novel I Was Jack Mortimer)
*Stolen Identity, directed by Gunther von Fritsch (1953, based on the novel I Was Jack Mortimer)
Land, das meine Sprache spricht, directed by Michael Kehlmann (1959, TV film, based on the novel Der zwanzigste Juli)
, directed by Michael Kehlmann (1961, TV film, based on the novel I Was Jack Mortimer)
, directed by Bernard Borderie (1972, based on the novel Die Abenteuer eines jungen Herrn in Polen)
The Standard, directed by Ottokar Runze (1977, based on the novel The Standard)
, directed by Michael Kehlmann (1980, TV film, based on the novel Der zwanzigste Juli)

Screenwriter 
 The Great Love (1942) (dir. Rolf Hansen)
  Die Entlassung (1942) (dir. Wolfgang Liebeneiner)
 On Resonant Shores (1948) (dir. Hans Unterkircher)
 Espionage (1955) (dir. Franz Antel)

References

External links
 To the Moon / Arthur's Death - two poems by Lernet-Holenia in English translation
 International Alexander Lernet-Holenia Society online (in German and English)
 
 

1897 births
1976 deaths
20th-century Austrian poets
20th-century Austrian dramatists and playwrights
20th-century Austrian novelists
Austrian male poets
Austrian Roman Catholics
Austrian untitled nobility
Austro-Hungarian military personnel of World War I
Austro-Hungarian Army officers
Commanders Crosses of the Order of Merit of the Federal Republic of Germany
Kleist Prize winners
Austrian male novelists
Austrian male dramatists and playwrights
Recipients of the Grand Austrian State Prize
Recipients of the Austrian Decoration for Science and Art
20th-century Austrian male writers
Austrian people of Slavic descent
Writers from Vienna
People from Innere Stadt
Olympic competitors in art competitions
Austrian magazine founders